Beriotisia fueguensis is a moth of the family Noctuidae. It is found in the Maule and Magallanes regions of Chile and the Neuquén Province of Argentina.

The wingspan is 32–38 mm.

External links
 Noctuinae of Chile

Noctuinae